Barbullush is a settlement in the former Bushat municipality, Shkodër County, northern Albania. At the 2015 local government reform it became part of the municipality Vau i Dejës.

References

Bushat
Populated places in Vau i Dejës
Villages in Shkodër County